The Embassy of the State of Palestine in Philippines is the diplomatic mission of the Palestine in Philippines.

See also

List of diplomatic missions of Palestine.

References

Diplomatic missions of the State of Palestine
State of Palestine–Philippines relations
Diplomatic missions in the Philippines